Thomas James Olmsted (born January 21, 1947) is an American prelate of the Roman Catholic Church. He was bishop of the Diocese of Phoenix in Arizona from 2003 to 2022. He previously served as bishop of the Diocese of Wichita in Kansas from 2001 to 2003. On June 10, 2022, Pope Francis accepted his resignation as bishop of Phoenix.

Biography

Early life 
Thomas James Olmsted was born on January 21, 1947, in Oketo, Kansas, to Pat and Helen Olmsted; he has two brothers and three sisters. Raised on a farm in Beattie, Kansas, he attended a single-room grade school and a small rural high school in Summerfield, Kansas. He then studied at St. Thomas Aquinas Seminary in Denver, Colorado, where he obtained a Bachelor of Philosophy degree in 1969.

Priesthood 
Olmsted was ordained to the priesthood on July 2, 1973, for the Diocese of Lincoln in Nebraska. After his ordination, Olmsted served as an associate pastor at the Cathedral of the Risen Christ Parish until 1976, when he began his doctoral studies in Rome.

Olmsted earned a Doctor of Canon Law degree summa cum laude in Rome from the Pontifical Gregorian University in 1981, and served as an official in the Vatican Secretariat of State from 1979 to 1988. During this period, he also worked as an assistant spiritual director at the Pontifical North American College in Rome.

Upon his return to Nebraska in 1989, Olmsted was named pastor of St. Vincent de Paul Parish in Seward, Nebraska, and promoter of justice for the diocesan tribunal. He later became dean of formation (1993) and president-rector (1997) at the Pontifical College Josephinum in Worthington, Ohio.

Bishop of Wichita 
On February 16, 1999, Olmsted was appointed coadjutor bishop of the Diocese of Wichita  by Pope John Paul II. He received his episcopal consecration on April 20, 1999, from Bishop Eugene Gerber, with Archbishop James Keleher and Bishop Fabian Bruskewitz serving as co-consecrators, at the Century II Convention Center in Wichita. Olmsted selected as his episcopal motto: Jesus Caritas, or "Love of Jesus", the name of the priestly fraternity founded by the Charles de Foucauld, to which he has belonged since 1974. 

Olmsted automatically succeeded Gerber as the seventh Bishop of Wichita when Gerber's resignation was accepted on October 4, 2001.

Bishop of Phoenix
Olmsted was named the fourth Bishop of the Diocese of Phoenix on November 25, 2003. He was installed on December 20, 2003, replacing Bishop Thomas O'Brien, who resigned after being arrested for his involvement in a fatal hit-and-run car accident.

In 2008, after the diocese had spent several million dollars to settle about 20 lawsuits, Olmsted led an initiative to shield diocesan assets from further sex abuse claims by incorporating local parishes individually.

From January 2008 to February 2009, Olmsted served as apostolic administrator of the Diocese of Gallup, acting as that diocese's interim leader until the appointment of Bishop James S. Wall.

Under Olmsted, the diocese researched and cataloged an index of its clergymen accused of sexually abusing children and released some of their identities to the public. The diocese published a list of sexually abusive clergymen on its website. Joe Baca, the Phoenix director of the Survivors Network of those Abused by Priests stated: "It's the right thing to do and I've got to give them that much. They need to use these names to help victims to come forward. But you know, there's still more they can do."

In July 2021, in response to Pope Francis' Motu Proprio Traditionis Custodes, which restricts the celebration of the Traditional Latin Mass (TLM), Olmsted issued a decree allowing the TLM to continue in the diocese under his dispensation pursuant to Canon 87 of the Code of Canon Law.

Early in 2022, one of Olmsted's pastors resigned after learning he that he had used the incorrect words when performing thousands of baptisms. Olmsted explained the importance of using the correct language in a letter to parishioners and said he believed the error, however inadvertent, required new baptisms.

Pope Francis accepted Olmsted's resignation as bishop of Phoenix on June 10, 2022.  Olmsted, despite his retirement was to remain apostolic administrator of the Ruthenian Catholic Eparchy of the Holy Protection of Mary of Phoenix.

Excommunication of Margaret McBride 

In May 2010, Olmsted declared that Sister Margaret McBride, who served on the ethics committee of St. Joseph's Hospital and Medical Center in Phoenix, was automatically excommunicated after permitting a patient to undergo an abortion there. The patient was a mother of four children who was 11 weeks pregnant and suffering from pulmonary hypertension. Hospital doctors had estimated that the woman's chance of dying if she continued the pregnancy was "close to 100 percent".

McBride has been accused of permitting a "direct abortion," which according to the Catholic Church's position is always wrong. The diocese stated that she was excommunicated because “she gave her consent that the abortion was a morally good and allowable act according to Church teaching" admitting this directly to Olmsted. "Since she gave her consent and encouraged an abortion she automatically excommunicated herself from the Church.”

As a result of the 2010 case, and because the hospital would not agree to ban future abortions, Olmsted announced on December 21, 2010, that the diocese was severing its ties with St. Joseph's and that the facility could no longer be called "a Catholic hospital".

Apostolic Administrator
On August 1, 2018, Pope Francis named Olmsted as apostolic administrator sede plena of the Ruthenian Catholic Eparchy of the Holy Protection of Mary of Phoenix  As of August 23, 2021 he was named apostolic administrator Sede vacante when Pope Francis accepted the resignation of Bishop John Pazak.

Viewpoints

Abortion 
During the 2008 U.S. presidential election, Olmsted declared a candidate's position on abortion rights for women to be the most important consideration for voters, stating, "When it comes to direct attacks on innocent human life, being right on all the other issues can never justify a wrong choice on this most serious matter."

On March 10, 2009, Olmsted spoke against President Barack Obama's decision to reverse restrictions on embryonic stem cell research, saying, "American taxpayers will now be paying for the killing of human beings at a very early stage in their lives (as embryos), so that scientific research can make use of them for experiments that may or may not yield positive results." He also referred to embryonic stem cell research as "homicidal research".

In March 2009, Olmsted criticized the University of Notre Dame for selecting Obama as the commencement speaker for its graduation ceremony and awarding him an honorary doctoral degree, calling the choice a "grave mistake." Olmsted said that Notre Dame's actions went against a previous decision of the United States Conference of Catholic Bishops in their June 2004 Statement “Catholics in Political Life”: "The Catholic community and Catholic institutions should not honor those who act in defiance of our fundamental moral principles. They should not be given awards, honors or platforms which would suggest support for their actions."

LBGT rights 
On September 12, 2008, Olmsted released a YouTube video urging Arizona voters to vote for Proposition 102, a referendum to amend the Arizona constitution to define marriage as the union of one man and one woman.

Immigration 
On March 8, 2010, Olmsted signed a letter expressing concern over Arizona SB 1070. He indicated that if the law passed, it might instill fear in those undocumented immigrants who are crime victims and deter them from going to the police out of fears of deportation.

See also

 Catholic Church hierarchy
 Catholic Church in the United States
 Historical list of the Catholic bishops of the United States
 List of Catholic bishops of the United States
 Lists of patriarchs, archbishops, and bishops

References

External links

 Roman Catholic Diocese of Phoenix Official Site

1947 births
Living people
People from Marshall County, Kansas
21st-century Roman Catholic bishops in the United States
Roman Catholic bishops of Phoenix
Pontifical College Josephinum faculty
Roman Catholic Diocese of Lincoln
Roman Catholic bishops of Wichita